Alexandre-Joseph Desenne (1785–1827) was a French artist. Son of a bookseller, he devoted himself to producing drawings for vignettes for the finest editions of the French classics - Nicolas Boileau, Jean Racine, Molière, Jean-Jacques Rousseau, Voltaire, etc.

Sources

1785 births
1827 deaths
French illustrators